SQL Database Studio is professional client for Microsoft SQL Server developed by Jan Prochazka in Czech Republic. 
SQL Database Studio (SDS) is used by database developers for designing database and also by average users for browsing data. SDS comes in two version. EXPRESS version is free even for commercial purposes but lacks some features that are in PRO version. SDS allows visualization  of GPS data. 
It is built using WPF application running on Microsoft .NET Framework 4.5.

Feature summary 
 GPS Visualization allows showing location data in map and exporting map
 SQL Query Designer
 Support for SELECT, INSERT, UPDATE queries
 Specific join operators - WHERE NOT EXISTS, CROSS APPLY, OUTER APPLY
 Database schema visualization
 Table column's  filter
 Database projects
 SQL Editor with auto complete 
 Run SQL commands in transaction
 Run SQL commands on multiple connections simultaneously
 Import and export to/from formats MS Excel, CSV, DBF
 Saving SQL scripts in projects not affecting database
 Database configuration with setting risk levels (Development database, production database)
 Data widgets (simple queries saved in database project, which are bind to some table, application than shows results of query while browsing table data)
 Database Jobs designer
 Switching between various GUI layouts
 DbShell Console is opensource project for database operation automation)

Supported databases 
 Microsoft SQL Server 2005, 2008, 2008R2,2012, 2014, 2016,2017,2019

References

Database administration tools
Windows-only free software
Microsoft database software
SQL